Samsara is a 2011 American non-narrative documentary film of international imagery directed by Ron Fricke and produced by Mark Magidson, who also collaborated on Baraka (1992), a film of a similar vein, and Chronos (1985).

Completed over a period of five years in 25 countries around the world, it was shot in 70 mm format and output to digital format. The film premiered at the 2011 Toronto International Film Festival and received a limited release in August 2012.

Synopsis
The official website describes, "Expanding on the themes they developed in Baraka (1992) and Chronos (1985), Samsara explores the wonders of our world from the mundane to the miraculous, looking into the unfathomable reaches of humanity's spirituality and the human experience. Neither a traditional documentary nor a travelogue, Samsara takes the form of a nonverbal, guided meditation."

Production
Samsara is directed by Ron Fricke and produced by Mark Magidson. The pair had collaborated on Baraka (1992) and reunited in 2006 to plan Samsara. They researched locations that would fit the conceptual imagery of saṃsāra, to them "meaning 'birth, death and rebirth' or 'impermanence'". They gathered research from people's works and photo books as well as the Internet and YouTube, resources not available at the time of planning Baraka. They considered using digital cameras but decided to film in 70 mm instead, considering its quality superior. Fricke and Magidson began filming Samsara the following year. Filming lasted for more than four years and took place in 25 countries across five continents. Three years into filming, the pair began assembling the film and editing it. They pursued several pick-up shoots to augment the final product.

The crew used three 70 mm cameras for filming; two cameras manufactured by Panavision and one specialty time-lapse camera designed by Fricke. While the scenes were captured on 65 mm negative film, they were output to Digital Cinema Package (DCP), a digital output. Magidson described the process, "We're doing a combination of what we think is the best of both technologies, the best way to image capture and then the best way to output. Once we get into the digital environment, we're able to refine the imagery, we're able to save shots that we'd have to otherwise trash really for various reasons." Where they cut their negatives for Baraka, the negatives for Samsara were scanned then worked on digitally. The pair used the Telecine process to format the film to ProRes for the editing process and used Final Cut for editing.

The crew shot from a bird's-eye view a scene of pilgrims surrounding the Kaaba in Mecca, Saudi Arabia. A 40-floor building was recently constructed next to the mosque that surrounded the Kaaba, so the filmmakers were able to film the pilgrims with permission of the building's owner.

Music
The score was composed by Michael Stearns, Lisa Gerrard and Marcello De Francisci. Stearns previously collaborated with the filmmakers on Baraka and Chronos, and Gerrard on Baraka. Unlike Baraka, Samsara was edited without music, and the composers worked on numerous sequences as separate pieces, before connecting. Magidson explained of the pieces, "It's a piece of music you can listen to as music as well that interprets their feelings to know that imagery in that sequence visually, so they're kind of interpreting it musically." The scoring process lasted between six and seven months.

Filming locations
Samsara was filmed in nearly one hundred locations across 25 countries over the course of exactly five years. Some locations include: Angola, Brazil, China, Denmark, Egypt, Ethiopia, France, Ghana, Hong Kong, India, Indonesia, Israel/Palestine, Italy, Japan, Mali, Myanmar, Namibia, Philippines, Saudi Arabia, South Korea, Thailand, Turkey, United Arab Emirates and United States.

Africa
Angola
 Epupa Falls

Egypt
 Egyptian Museum, Cairo
 Great pyramids of Giza
 City of the Dead, Cairo

Ethiopia
 Mursi village, Omo Valley

Ghana
 Kane Kwei Carpentry Workshop, "Sodom ang Gomorrah", Osu Accra

Mali
 Great Mosque of Djenné
 Dogon Village, Bandiagara Escarpment
 Cliff Dwellings near Terelli

Namibia
 Sossusvlei – Namib-Naukluft National Park
 Lüderitz – Kolmanskop
 Himba village, Kunene
 Skeleton Coast

Asia
China
 Tagou Martial Arts School, Zhengzhou
 Shanghai
 Changchun City, Jilin Province
 Zhangzhou City, Fujian Province
 Beijing (1000 Hands Dance)
Hong Kong
Lan Kwai Fong Hotel
India
 Thikse Monastery, Leh, Ladakh
Indonesia
 Tri Pusaka Sakti Art Foundation
 Kawah Ijen Sulfur Mine, East Java

Israel and Palestinian Territories
 Nablus Checkpoint, Nablus
 Bethlehem
 Dome of the Rock, East Jerusalem
 Church of the Redeemer, East Jerusalem
 Western Wall, East Jerusalem

Japan
 Lotte Kasai driving range, Chiba
 YK Tsuchiya Shokai Doll Factory, Tokyo
 Osaka University
 Atri, Kyoto
 Fushimi Inari Shrine, Kyoto
 Toshimaen/Hydropolis, Tokyo
 Yoyogi Park, Tokyo
 Orient Kogyo Showroom, Tokyo
 Advanced Telecommunications Research Institute International ATR, Tokyo
Jordan
 Petra

Myanmar
 Bagan, Mandalay
 Mount Popa, Popa Taungkalat Monastery
 Mingun temple

Philippines
 Cebu Provincial Detention and Rehabilitation Center (CPDRC Dancing Inmates), Cebu City
 Payatas Trash Dump, Quezon City
 Arms Corporation of the Philippines
 Manila Streets
Saudi Arabia
 Al-Masjid al-Haram, Mecca
South Korea
 Demilitarized zone, Panmunjom
 Hyundai Glovis, Co. Ltd Shipyards, Seoul
Thailand
 Cascade Go-Go Bar, Nana Plaza, Bangkok
 Siriraj Medical Museum, Bangkok
Turkey
 Mount Nemrut National Park, Adıyaman
 Cappadocia
 Sultan Ahmed Mosque, Istanbul
United Arab Emirates
 Ski Dubai
 Dubai Mall
 Burj Khalifa
 Burj Al Arab Hotel
 Palm Island Development

Europe
Denmark
 Moesgård Museum
 Silkeborg Museum
 Mariesminde Poultry Farm
 Bøgely Svineproduktion

France
 Château de Versailles
 La Sainte-Chapelle, Paris
 Mont-Saint-Michel
 Cathedral Notre-Dame de Paris, Paris
 Cathedral Notre Dame de Reims
 Paris Métro
 Mont Blanc
 Aiguille du Midi
 Olivier de Sagazan, Paris

Italy
 Mont Blanc
 Galleria Vittorio Emanuele II, Milan
 Teatro alla Scala, Milan
 Catacombe dei Cappuccini, Palermo
 St. Peter's Basilica, Vatican City

The Americas
Brazil
 Divino Salvador Church, São Paulo
 Sé Metro Station, São Paulo
 Paraisópolis favela, São Paulo

United States
 Carnegie Hall
 Times Square
 Hunts Mesa, Monument Valley, Arizona
 Antelope Canyon, Arizona
 Kīlauea volcano, Hawaii
 Ninth Ward, New Orleans, Louisiana
 Delicate Arch, Arches National Park, Utah
 El Capitan, Yosemite National Park, California
 Mono Lake, Mono Basin, California
 Arlington National Cemetery, Virginia

Themes
Fricke and Magidson emphasized avoiding a particular political view in assembling the film. Fricke said, "We just try to keep it in the middle and then we form little blocks of content and then we set them aside until we have enough. We did all of this without music or sound effects. We just let the image guide the flow and then we started stringing the blocks together." Nicolas Rapold of The New York Times wrote that Samsara's lack of a specific message is "a departure from similarly expansive, globally conscious nonfiction films in vogue now, like the critically acclaimed work of Michael Glawogger ('Workingman's Death,' which depicts the same sulfur mines as 'Samsara') and Nikolaus Geyrhalter ('Abendland') that also serve as probing sociological critique."

Release

Box office
Samsara premiered at the Toronto International Film Festival in September 2011. In March 2012, Oscilloscope Laboratories acquired the rights to distribute Samsara in the United States. By its fifth weekend (September 14–16), Samsara had expanded to 60 theaters and achieved the highest-grossing documentary release of 2012. On , distributor Oscilloscope Laboratories announced that at $1.8 million in box office earnings, Samsara had become the highest-grossing film in Oscilloscope's (relatively short) history.

Critical reception
Rotten Tomatoes gives the film a score of 76% based on reviews from 79 critics and reports a rating average of 7.00/10. It reports the critics' consensus that "it's a tad heavy-handed in its message, but Samsara's overwhelmingly beautiful visuals more than compensate for any narrative flaws." At Metacritic, which assigns a weighted average score out of 100 to reviews from mainstream critics, the film received an average score of 65% based on 23 reviews, reflecting "generally favorable reviews."

Kenneth Turan, reviewing for the Los Angeles Times, called Samsara "as frustrating as it is beautiful." Turan expressed frustration that the filmmakers did not name the more obscure locations, such as the Cebu Provincial Detention and Rehabilitation Center in the Philippines. The critic also took issue with some of the film's "disconcerting" images. Turan concluded, "Some of the connections made are too obvious, like following images of ammunition with a portrait of a severely wounded veteran, while others are completely elusive. Shots of the devastation Katrina left behind in New Orleans are beautifully spooky, but does it say anything useful to follow that with images of Versailles? The makers of 'Samsara' want to free our minds, but their technique makes us their prisoners more often than not."

In the Chicago Sun-Times, Roger Ebert awarded Samsara a full four stars, writing that it provided "an uplifting experience" through its use "of powerful images, most magnificent, some shocking, all photographed with great care in the highest possible HD resolution." Ebert extolled the film's capturing of images of what may eventually be lost to humanity and noted that there were also images that could reflect the reason for these losses. Katie Walsh, writing for indieWire's The Playlist, applauded Samsaras "technical achievements" and noted that the film used the "intellectual montage" technique. Walsh said the film was similar to Man with a Movie Camera, but took "the idea to new global and spiritual heights." She said of the film's entirety, "While one can discuss the technical prowess of these shocking and beautiful images, it doesn't do justice to the spiritual cinematic power of this work."

See also
 Baraka (film)
 Chronos (film)
 Qatsi trilogy
 List of films with longest production time

References

External links
 
 

2011 documentary films
2011 films
American documentary films
Documentary films about spirituality
Films directed by Ron Fricke
Films without speech
Non-narrative films
Films scored by Michael Stearns
Documentary films about India
Films shot in Ladakh
2010s American films